Cathay Pacific operates a fleet of narrow-body and wide-body passenger aircraft composed of the Airbus A321, Airbus A321neo, Airbus A330, Airbus A350 XWB, and Boeing 777 aircraft. The airline also operates a fleet of 20 Boeing 747 freighters.

Current fleet

, Cathay Pacific operates the following aircraft:

Special liveries
On 23 April 1996, an Airbus A330-300 (registered as VR-HYD) was painted and delivered in the special 50th Anniversary livery, in celebration of the airline's 50th Anniversary. The aircraft had a special decal placed at the vertical stabilizer. The sticker features a stylized "50". The green band around the nose is removed as well. However, the "Cathay Pacific" wordmark is retained. The aircraft was short-lived with Cathay Pacific, causing it to transfer to Dragonair in July 1996. This is possibly a concept of the new livery of Cathay Pacific, which was not yet released until November 2015.

In 1997, a Boeing 747-200 (B-HIB) named Spirit of Hong Kong, was painted with a special livery, a big traditional Chinese brushstroke character "" (means family/home), a slogan in traditional Chinese "" painted on the left side of the aircraft and a slogan, "The Spirit of Hong Kong 97," painted on the right side of the aircraft, to commemorate the handover of Hong Kong from the United Kingdom to China. The aircraft was retired in December 1999. On 17 January 2000, Spirit of Hong Kong made a return on a Boeing 747-400 (B-HOX) to celebrate the legendary resilience of Hong Kong, with a new special livery depicting a young athlete overcoming a series of challenges to reach his goal. A special motto — "Same Team. Same Dream." — was painted on the left side of the aircraft, and a motto in traditional Chinese ("") was painted on the right side of the aircraft. The aircraft was repainted to the standard livery in December 2003. On 30 July 2013, Spirit of Hong Kong made another return, this time, on a Boeing 777-300ER (B-KPB). The livery features 110 people who represent the extraordinary spirit of Hong Kong people. The livery also bears the slogan "The Spirit of Hong Kong ". The livery is the result of an online contest held by Cathay Pacific to call on Hong Kong people to submit creative entries that illustrate the true spirit of the city, along with a full-body photograph of themselves. The judging panel then chose 100 winners and 10 champions, and their silhouettes were painted on the aircraft. The aircraft was withdrawn from service in October 2018 at the expiration of its lease. In celebration of Hong Kong's 20th anniversary of handover, Spirit of Hong Kong is also painted on a Boeing 777-300 (B-HNK) in June 2017, but instead of the original Spirit of Hong Kong livery, it is blended with clouds and flowers on the grey band on the fuselage and near the tail under the revised Cathay Pacific livery. It is also the sister aircraft to Cathay Dragon's Airbus A330-300 (B-HYB), which is also painted in the similar livery.

On 5 July 2002, a Boeing 747-400 (B-HOY) - named Asia's World City - carried a special livery, the "Asia's world city" brandline, the Brand Hong Kong logotype and the dragon symbol, to promote Hong Kong around the world. The aircraft was repainted to the standard Cathay Pacific livery in December 2008. In January 2008, it was also painted and delivered on the same livery, this time on a Boeing 777-300ER (B-KPF), until it was repainted into the standard Cathay Pacific livery in March 2014.

On 29 August 2006, the airline took delivery of its 100th aircraft, an Airbus A330-300 (B-LAD). For the aircraft acceptance ceremony in Toulouse, the aircraft was painted in a 100th aircraft livery with the slogan "100th aircraft," and the slogan in traditional Chinese "" painted on the rear of the aircraft. The aircraft was repainted into the standard Cathay Pacific livery in September 2012. The aircraft was named Progress Hong Kong, a name that was chosen as the result of a competition among the staff.

In November 2011, Cathay Pacific received its second 747-8 freighter (B-LJA), which was painted in the Hong Kong Trader livery. The livery was designed to commemorate the topping out of the new Cathay Pacific Cargo Terminal. The name of the livery was taken from Cathay Pacific's very first 747 freighter, which entered the fleet in 1982. The aircraft was eventually repainted into the revised Cathay Pacific livery in August 2018.

Several Cathay Pacific aircraft have been painted in the Oneworld livery, the first to commemorate the alliance's 10th anniversary. On 12 March 2009, Cathay Pacific's first Oneworld aircraft, an Airbus A340-300 (B-HXG), was painted in the new, standard Oneworld livery, and was retired in March 2017. A second aircraft, an Airbus A330-300 (B-HLU), was painted in the Oneworld livery from September 2009, while a Boeing 777-300ER (B-KPL) was painted and delivered in the Oneworld livery on 17 October 2009, until it was repainted into the revised Cathay Pacific livery from October 2017. The latter aircraft was withdrawn from service in June 2020 amidst the COVID-19 pandemic and returned to its lessor in August 2021 at the expiration of its lease. Five Boeing 777-300ERs (B-KPD, B-KQI, B-KQL, B-KQM & B-KQN) then received the Oneworld livery under the revised Cathay Pacific livery in March, April, September, December 2019 and January 2020 respectively in celebration of the alliance's 20th anniversary in March 2019. However, the Oneworld logo beside the cockpit windows was replaced by the Cathay Pacific logo, as well as the grey band retaining on the fuselage.

Fleet history
Since its inception in 1946, the Cathay Pacific fleet has operated many types of aircraft. The first two aircraft were two World War II surplus Douglas DC-3s, named Betsy and Niki. Betsy (registration VR-HDB), the first aircraft for Cathay Pacific, is now a permanent exhibit in the Hong Kong Science Museum. Niki was lost, but a similar DC-3 was purchased as a replacement. It was refurbished and repainted by the airline's engineering department and maintenance provider, Hong Kong Aircraft Engineering Company, and it now wears the second Cathay Pacific livery from the late 1940s. This aircraft is now on public view in the car park outside the Flight Training Center of Cathay City. Cathay Pacific was at one time, the largest operator of the Lockheed L-1011 outside of the United States with a fleet of 19 (Delta Air Lines in the U.S was the largest with 71) before being replaced by the Airbus A330-342s in 1996.

References

External links 

Cathay Pacific
Lists of aircraft by operator